Pellenes striolatus is a jumping spider species in the genus Pellenes. It lives on the Socotra Archipelago off the coast of the Yemen. The species was first described in 2002.

References

Salticidae
Endemic fauna of Socotra
Spiders of Asia
Spiders described in 2002
Taxa named by Wanda Wesołowska